Energy 100 FM is a commercial radio station in Windhoek, Namibia. It is the most tuned-in station in Namibia with an estimated figure of 100,000. The station was founded in  1996 and has a listening frequency across Namibia.

In 2018, Energy became the first station in Namibia to launch video content. In 2017, it partnered with MTC to air the first schools national debate competition on radio.

Presenters
The station has had different presenters. It has produced some of that have won the best Radio Presenters in Namibia.

See also
Telecommunications in Namibia

References

Radio stations in Namibia